Naperville North High School is a public four-year high school located at the corner of Ogden Avenue and Mill Street in the northern-central part of Naperville, Illinois, a western suburb of Chicago, Illinois, in the United States. It is the counterpart to Naperville Central High School of Naperville Community Unit School District 203. Naperville North is fully recognized by the Illinois State Board of Education and is a member of the Illinois Association for College Admission Counseling.

History
The building was constructed in 1970 comprising 152,347 square feet (14,000 m²). Additions to the building were made in 1974, 1986 and 1992, increasing the size to the current (as of 2005) 449,665 square feet (42,000 m²). From 1970-1974 Naperville North was limited to freshmen classes only, who were then transferred to Naperville Central High School to continue their education. From the time of its construction until the 1992-1993 academic year, Naperville North was the only high school in its district to have a swimming pool. Thus Naperville Central High School students who took Physical Education courses in swimming or desired to compete in swimming and/or diving would be bussed from Naperville Central to Naperville North. The stadium and pool underwent significant renovations during the 2008-2009 and 2010-2011 school years, with more renovations during 2015-2016 to change the Library into a Learning Commons area, respectively.

Demographics
In 2020, 59.1% of the student body identifies as White, 19.4% of the student body identifies as Asian, 12.4% of the student body identifies as Hispanic, 4.3% of the student body identifies as Black, and 4.8% of the student body identifies as another race.

Academics
In 2008, Naperville North had an average composite ACT score of 25.4, and graduated 100.0% of its senior class. Naperville North has not made Adequate Yearly Progress (AYP) on the Prairie State Achievement Examination, which with the ACT, are the assessment tools used in Illinois to fulfill the federal No Child Left Behind Act.  One student subgroup failed to meet expectations in reading and mathematics.

In 2010, Newsweek ranked Naperville North #1332 in their annual list of the top 1500 American public high schools, based upon the total number of Advanced Placement, International Baccalaureate or Cambridge tests given at a school, divided by the number of seniors graduating that year.  In 2005, the school was ranked #1008, in 2007, #1082, in 2008 #926, and in 2009 #1331.<ref>{{cite web|url=http://www.newsweek.com/id/201160/?q=2009/rank/1301|title=The Top of the Class - The complete list of the 1,500 top U.S. high schools; 8 June 2009; Newsweek.com; accessed 23 June 2009|website=Newsweek }}</ref> In 2018, U.S. Secretary of Education Betsy DeVos recognized Naperville North as one of the 349 National Blue Ribbon Schools.

In 2020, Naperville North High School was accredited with an International Green Ribbon for Extraordinary Schools.

Naperville North is fully recognized by the Illinois State Board of Education, and is a member of the Illinois Association for College Admission Counseling.

Athletics

Naperville North competes in the DuPage Valley Conference (DVC). Naperville North is a member of the Illinois High School Association (IHSA), which governs most interscholastic sports and competitive activities in Illinois.  The school's teams are stylized as the Huskies. The mascot's name is Buster.

From 1975–1987, Naperville North played its home football games at Naperville Central.  In 1988, Naperville North opened Harshbarger/Welzel Stadium as its new home field.

The school sponsors interscholastic athletic teams for young men and women in basketball, cross country, golf, gymnastics, lacrosse, soccer, swimming & diving, tennis, track & field, volleyball, and water polo.  Young men may also compete in baseball, football, and wrestling, while young women may compete in badminton, cheerleading, and softball.  In addition to the above sports, the school also offers club sports in ice hockey and ultimate frisbee.

The men's water polo team has been a historically successful program earning multiple state trophies throughout the years.

The following teams have won their respective IHSA sponsored state tournament or meet:

 Badminton (girls): 1st place (tie) (2011–12)
 Cross Country (boys): State Champions (2008–09)
 Cross Country (girls): State Champions (1993–94, 2001–02, 2004–05, 2005–06, 2012–13, 2014–15, 2016-17, 2017-18, 2018-19, 2019-20)
 Football: State Champions (1992–93, 2007–08)
 Golf (boys): State Champions (1989–90, 1994–95)
 Gymnastics (boys): State Champions (2000–01)
 Soccer (boys): State Champions (1998–99) (2016–17) (2017–18) (2018-19) 
 Soccer (girls): State Champions (1987–88, 2011–12)
 Swimming & Diving (boys): State Champions (1995–96)
 Tennis (boys): State Champions (1993–94)
 Volleyball (boys): State Champions (1996–97)

Activities

The school is also host to a Certamen; a quizbowl-like team, placing first in the 2004 state Latin convention; the Northern Lights, a nationally competitive winter guard; the Marching Huskies marching band, who tied for second in the state championship in 2005 and took fourth in state in 2009; and a drama department that contributes regularly to the Illinois High School Theatre Fest. Notable recent IHSTF productions with North students in the cast or crew began with The Kentucky Cycle in 1999, ending a decade-long absence from the festival, and have since included West Side Story, Pirates of Penzance and Macbeth.  In 2000, a Naperville North adaptation of 12 Angry Men (presented as Twelve Angry Jurors), was selected to perform as a showcase at the IHS Theatre Festival.  More recent selections taken to state include The Laramie Project, Angel's Fall and Wings.  The Naperville North theatre recently received a technical over-haul, allowing for better lighting and control mechanisms. North's newspaper, the North Star, has won numerous local and statewide awards.

The Math Team at Naperville North has been the DuPage Valley Conference champions for 28 consecutive years and were Illinois state champions 14 of the last 16 years, and won ten consecutive Math Team state championships (1998–2007). Naperville North also participates in the North Suburban Math League. In 2008, the math team competed at the ICTM Regional competition at the College of DuPage and placed 1st overall. During the ICTM State competition at the University of Illinois in 2008, Naperville North lost to IMSA, which prevented North from winning their 11th consecutive state championship. They received 2nd place overall. In 2009, Naperville North regained the state title, their fourteenth in sixteen years.Glenbrook North math team takes fifth at state  Naperville North again won the ICTM Division 4AA state championship in 2016. The WYSE team won the state championship from 1999 to 2005, 2007 to 2009, 2012, and 2013.

In 2009, Naperville North created a FIRST Robotics Competition Team. Huskie Robotics is one of the school's largest clubs and is well known around the school and surrounding community for its outreach events. The student-led team builds competitive robots with support from teacher-coaches, mentors, and corporate sponsors. In 2013, Huskie Robotics was part of the winning alliance at the Midwest Regional, granting them a spot in the FIRST Robotics World Championship in St. Louis. In 2020 and 2021, Huskie Robotics won the Chairman's Award at the Midwest regional.

Naperville North has a Junior State of America (JSA) chapter. Naperville North's JSA chapter is well known, and has a high chapter membership in the Midwest state. They are debaters who form a tight knit group. The chapter is also involved in the state structure of JSA.
Naperville North also has a DECA Chapter. The DECA chapter has grown in size and in caliber. In the past five years, Naperville North's DECA chapter has had over fifty different state qualifiers, ten state winners (top three), five national winners, including one taking the championship, and elected a State President, who leads Illinois DECA.

In the winter of 2011, NNHS announced they may have to discontinue print publication of "The North Star." This happened as a result of decreased advertising revenue and subscribers.

In 2018, NNHS announced a new esports club, hosting competitive teams in games such as Rocket League, Overwatch, and League of Legends. It quickly grew into one of the school's largest organizations. That same year the IHSA began laying the foundation for an Esports State Series and State Final (IHSEA). NHNHS esports went on to win the Illinois High School Esports Association in Overwatch championship in May 2019. In late 2019 as a rookie team they competed in the North America Scholastic Esports Federation Overwatch Tournament, eventually traveling to Santa Clara, CA where they lost in the championship finals to Rocklin High School.

Partnerships
The school offers an international exchange program with Steinbart Gymnasium in Duisburg, Germany. The partnership is part of the German American Partnership Program.

Notable alumni
 Kevin Barnett, former professional volleyball player; competed at 2000 and 2004 Summer Olympics; current Pac-12 and Fox Sports broadcaster.
 Paul Brittain, actor and comedian; former cast member of Saturday Night Live.
 Chris Brown, former NFL running back
 Levelle Brown, former professional football playerGoddard, Joe; Brown now leads the Rush; 23 March 2003; Chicago Sun-Times; accessed 23 June 2009
 Henry Domercant, former EuroLeague guard; current head coach of the Windy City Bulls of the NBA G League.
 Glenn Earl, former NFL safety
 Dave Garnett, former NFL linebacker
 Emily Giffin, author of Something Borrowed (one former Naperville North teacher inspired a character in the novel)Sotonoff, Jamie; Girl Talk; 21 July 2005; Daily Herald
 Jerry Hairston Jr., former MLB infielderAdams, Todd M; Hairston never given chance to show his worth in Cubby blue; 6 June 2006; The Sun - Naperville; accessed 23 June 2009
 Scott Hairston, former MLB outfielder
 Adrian Holovaty, Web developer, journalist, entrepreneur, co-creator of the Django
 James Holzhauer, Jeopardy! contestant
 Jordan Johnson, former professional MMA fighter
 Will Johnson, professional soccer player and winner of the 2008 MLS Goal of the Year Award.
Matt LaCosse, former NFL tight end
 Justin McCareins, former NFL wide receiverMorrissey, Rick; McCareins comes up big on final drive for Titans; 11 January 2003; Chicago Tribune
 Marisol Nichols, actress (Nadia Yassir in 24)Voting page for "Naperville's Most Famous", sponsored by the Naperville Sun newspaper. 
 Bob Odenkirk, comedian, actor, writer, director and producer (Mr. Show). (Better Call Saul) (Breaking Bad'')
James O'Shaughnessy, tight end for NFL's Chicago Bears
Joshua Penn, professional soccer player in the MLS
 Brian Plotkin, former professional soccer player; current head coach of Army men's soccer
 Matthew Prozialeck blues musician, harmonica player
 Andrew Santino, stand-up comedian
 Nick Solak, MLB second baseman/outfielder
 Jeri Kehn Thompson, in talk radio personality, Republican consultant,  wife of Sen. Fred Thompson.
Sachal Vasandani, jazz singer & composer
Lucy Westlake, youngest American Woman to summit Mount Everest.
 Paula Zahn, an American journalist, newscaster, and anchor at ABC News, CBS News, Fox News, and CNN. Current producer and host of "On the Case with Paula Zahn" on the Investigation Discovery channel.

Notable faculty
 J. Glenn Schneider (1935-2017), history and government teacher; served in the Illinois House of Representatives

See also
List of high schools in Illinois

References

External links

Naperville Community Unit School District 203

Public high schools in Illinois
Educational institutions established in 1970
Education in Naperville, Illinois
Schools in DuPage County, Illinois
1970 establishments in Illinois